Yulong may refer to:

 Yulong Naxi Autonomous County, of Lijiang, Yunnan
 Yulong Snow Mountain, or Jade Dragon Snow Mountain
 Yulong River, in Guangxi
 Yulongsi Formation, in Yunnan
 Yulong, Xingyang, town in Xingyang City, Henan
 Yulong (dinosaur), a genus of oviraptorid dinosaur
 Yulong, a Chinese mobile phone maker, a subsidiary of Coolpad Group.
 Yulong Copper Mine, a mine of Western Mining Co., Ltd.
 An Yulong (born 1978), Chinese short-track speed skater

See also
 Yu Long (pinyin: Yú Lóng; born 1964) Chinese music conductor
 Longyu (1868-1913) Dowager Empress of China